Jean Baker (born 1958, in Huthwaite) is a former English international lawn and indoor bowler.

Bowls career

World Championships
Baker won bronze medals at the 1992 World Outdoor Bowls Championship, 1996 World Outdoor Bowls Championship and 2000 World Outdoor Bowls Championship. In 2004, she won the gold medal in the fours with Jayne Christie, Amy Monkhouse and Ellen Falkner at the 2004 World Outdoor Bowls Championship.

Commonwealth Games
Baker represented England in the fours event, at the 1994 Commonwealth Games in Victoria, British Columbia, Canada. She won bronze medals at the 1998 Commonwealth Games and 2006 Commonwealth Games, in addition to competing in the 2002 Commonwealth Games.

Other
In 2007 she won the triples gold medal at the Atlantic Bowls Championships.

Baker has won five English national titles at the English National Bowls Championships; the 1989 singles, 1997 fours, 2006 triples & fours and the 2009 pairs. She subsequently won the 2007 triples and fours at the British Isles Bowls Championships.

References

External links
  (1994–2006)
 

Living people
1958 births
English female bowls players
Bowls World Champions
Commonwealth Games medallists in lawn bowls
Commonwealth Games bronze medallists for England
Bowls players at the 1994 Commonwealth Games
Bowls players at the 1998 Commonwealth Games
Bowls players at the 2002 Commonwealth Games
Bowls players at the 2006 Commonwealth Games
People from Huthwaite
Sportspeople from Nottinghamshire
Medallists at the 1998 Commonwealth Games
Medallists at the 2006 Commonwealth Games